Bartl Gensbichler (born 9 September 1956 in Saalbach-Hinterglemm) is a retired Austrian alpine skier. He finished 11th overall in the Men's Downhill in the 1976–77 FIS Alpine Ski World Cup.

External links
 

1956 births
Living people
Austrian male alpine skiers
People from Zell am See District
Sportspeople from Salzburg (state)